Carmen Parra (born 1944 in Mexico City) is a Mexican painter. Her work is inspired in the New Spain iconography art: angels, archangel, eagles, butterflies and flowers.

Life
She was daughter of the architect Manuel Parra and María del Carmen Rodrìguez Peña.

She studied in National High School no. 5 of UNAM and then she continued her social anthropology studies in the National School of Anthropology and History. She also studied graphic design for movies in Royal College of Art of London, painting in Rome and music in Rio de Janeiro.

When she returned to Mexico, she finished her arts studies, and was Juan Soriano student.
Her work and paintings has been exposed in several countries.

Her techniques are oil, gouache, amate paper, serigraphy, among others.

Publications about her work
 2015 Metamorfosis, travesía de Carmen Parra, varios autores, Medicine Faculty, UNAM and The Aspen Institute Mexico, Mexico City.
 2011 Carmen Parra: Peregrina del aire, varios autores, Fondo editorial de la Plástica Mexicana, Mexico City.
 2007 La grafostática u Oda a Eiffel, textos de Salvador Elizondo, Pablo Ortiz Monasterio photographies, Talleres Gráficos de la Nación, Mexico City.
 2005 Sin Cesar, Centro de Cultura Casa Lamm, Mexico City.
 1997 Der Himmel auf Erden, Eine zeitgenössische Vision des Barock in Mexiko, Erfurt und Moritzburg.
 1980 Tiempo cautivo, la Catedral de México, textos de Gonzalo Celorio, Galería Arvil, Mexico City.
 (No Date) La Cathédrale de Mexico : Temps captif, Gonzalo Celorio, Secretaria de desarrollo urbano y ecología, México.
 (No Date) Carmen Parra, Angels and Archangels: A vision of the Baroque in Mexico, El Aire Centro de Arte, Mexico City.

Expositions list 
 2015 Carmen Parra and José Antonio Farrera, La flor de loto y el cardo, México City.
 2015 Carmen Parra and Beppe Vesco, Un uomo in fuga, il Caravaggio, Italy.
 2015 Carmen Parra, Suave Patria, El Aire, Centro de Arte, A. C., México D.F.
 2011 Carmen Parra, República del Aire: el Águila contra la Patria en extinción, Vicente Quirarte, Cultural Diffusion Coordination, UNAM, Mexico City.
 2000 Carmen Parra, Mariposa Monarca, Polvo de estrellas, Secretaria de Educación Púbica, el Aire Centro de Arte, México City.
 1997 Carmen Parra, En alas de la palabra, Ed. El aire Centro de Arte y Turner Libros, México City.
 1993 Carmen Parra, Acercamiento al misterio: La Catedral de México, Secretaria de Desarrollo Social, Ed. El Equilibrista – Turner Libros, Mexico City.
 1993 La traducción del retorno, Caja Madrid Fundación, Turner Libros, Madrid.

References 

1944 births
Living people
20th-century Mexican women artists
21st-century Mexican women artists
Mexican painters
Mexican women painters
Artists from Mexico City
Alumni of the Royal College of Art
Mexican_artists